is a passenger railway station located] in the city of Kawaguchi, Saitama, Japan, operated by the East Japan Railway Company (JR East).

Lines
Nishi-Kawaguchi Station is served by the Keihin-Tōhoku Line linking Saitama Prefecture with central Tokyo and Kanagawa Prefecture, and is located 17.8 kilometers from Tokyo Station.

Layout
The station has one island platform serving two tracks, with an elevated station building. The station is staffed.

Platforms

History 
The station opened on 1 September 1954. With the privatization of JNR on 1 April 1987, the station came under the control of JR East.

Passenger statistics 
In fiscal 2019, the station was used by an average of 59,062 passengers daily (boarding passengers only).

Surrounding area
Kawaguchi City Industrial Culture Center
Kawaguchi City High School
Bunan Junior and Senior High School
Saitama Prefectural Kawaguchi Technical High School

See also
List of railway stations in Japan

References

External links

 JR East Station Information

Railway stations in Saitama Prefecture
Keihin-Tōhoku Line
Stations of East Japan Railway Company
Railway stations in Kawaguchi, Saitama
Railway stations in Japan opened in 1954